Count Lajos Széchényi de Sárvár-Felsővidék (28 March 1868 – 14 April 1919) was a Hungarian diplomat of Austria-Hungary serving as envoy to Bulgaria and the Netherlands during World War I.

Life 
Born in Gyönk on 28 March 1868 into a prominent Hungarian noble family. His older brother Bertalan (1866–1943) was a politician who served in the Hungarian House of Magnates and his uncle Imre (1825–1898) served as Ambassador to Germany from 1878 to 1892.

Count Széchényi entered the Austro-Hungarian foreign service in 1892 and served subsequently in Brussels, Washington D.C., Rome, St. Petersburg and London.

In 1909, Count Széchényi was selected to lead the diplomatic agency in Cairo with the title of Consul-General and remained in charge until the outbreak of war in 1914 when it was dissolved. During World War I, he entered military service and served in Serbia.

In November 1916, Count Széchényi was appointed Minister of the Dual Monarchy at Sofia to succeed Count Tarnowski who had been appointed Ambassador to the United States. However, he was transferred to The Hague already in January the following year to make place in Sofia for Count Otto von Czernin, the younger brother of the Imperial Foreign Minister Count Ottokar von Czernin, and remained there until the end of the war, being accredited also to Luxembourg.

After having lost much of his estates after the war, Count Széchényi died at Kaltenleutgeben on 14 April 1919 at the early age of 51.

Notes

References

External links
 'Széchenyi Lajos, gróf', Magyar Életrajzi Lexikon

1868 births
1919 deaths
Austro-Hungarian diplomats of World War I
Austro-Hungarian diplomats
Austrian diplomats
Hungarian diplomats
Hungarian nobility
Lajos, Szechenyi